The 1996–97 United Counties League season was the 90th in the history of the United Counties League, a football competition in England.

Premier Division

The Premier Division featured 19 clubs which competed in the division last season, along with one new club:
Ford Sports Daventry, promoted from Division One

League table

Division One

Division One featured 17 clubs which competed in the division last season, along with one new club:
Huntingdon United, joined from the West Anglia League

Also, Thrapston Venturas changed name to Thrapston Town.

League table

References

External links
 United Counties League

1996–97 in English football leagues
United Counties League seasons